Brummer may refer to:

People
Brummer (surname)
Brummer Badenhorst (born 1990), South African rugby union player

Ships
Brummer class cruiser, a class of two Imperial German Navy light mine-laying cruisers of World War I
SMS Brummer, lead ship of the class
German training ship Brummer, a German World War II ship
HNoMS Olav Tryggvason, a Royal Norwegian Navy ship captured by the Germans in World War II and renamed Brummer

See also
Brumer (disambiguation)
 Brümmer